Birgit Tengroth (13 July 1915 – 21 September 1983) was a Swedish film actress. She appeared in more than 40 films between 1926 and 1950.

Biography
Tengroth debuted in Sven Jerring's radio show 'Barnens Brevlåda' together with her friend Sickan Carlsson at the age of 10. She studied at Royal Opera's ballet school 1926-31. Her first work for the movies was a small part in Mordbrännerskan (1926). She got a contract with the leading Swedish studio Svensk Filmindustri (SF) in 1932 and remained there throughout the decade. She was known for playing fresh, girl next door roles, which gave her a popular following amongst young fans. When Ingrid Bergman made her screen debut, she was unfavourably compared to Tengroth.

During the 1940s she left Svensk Filmindustri and worked for a variety of companies. After leaving the movie business in 1950, she became an author and journalist. She was briefly married to the Danish politician Jens Otto Krag, later Prime Minister, in the early 1950s. In some of later writings she was very critical of the Swedish film industry during her years of stardom. 

Due to sickness, she spent the last years of her life in total isolation.

Selected filmography 

 The Devil and the Smalander (1927)
 Sin (1928)
 The Storholmen Brothers (1932)
 His Life's Match (1932)
 What Do Men Know? (1933)
 Marriageable Daughters (1933)
 Boman's Boy (1933)
 Man's Way with Women (1934)
 The Atlantic Adventure (1934)
 The Family Secret (1936)
 It Pays to Advertise (1936)
 Johan Ulfstjerna (1936)
 Oh, Such a Night! (1937)
 Dollar (1938)
 Gubben kommer (1939)
 Gläd dig i din ungdom (1939)
 Between Us Barons (1939)
 A Real Man (1940)
 Västkustens hjältar (1940)
 How to Tame a Real Man (1941)
 Rospiggar (1942)
 Night in Port (1943)
 Sonja (1943)
 Katrina (1943)
 Life and Death (1943)
 The Forest Is Our Heritage (1944)
 Man's Woman (1945)
 Dynamite (1947)
 Soldier's Reminder (1947)
Sin (1948)
 Thirst (1949)
 Girl with Hyacinths (1950)

Writings 
 Thirst (Törst), novel

 References 

 Bibliography 
 Per Olov Qvist & Peter von Bagh. Guide to the Cinema of Sweden and Finland''. Greenwood Publishing Group, 2000.

External links 
 

1915 births
1983 deaths
Actresses from Stockholm
Burials at Galärvarvskyrkogården
Swedish film actresses
20th-century Swedish actresses